The 2013–14 Sporting de Gijón season is the second season that the club will play in Segunda División after the relegation from the highest tier of football in Spain, La Liga.

Season overview

Preseason

José Ramón Sandoval continued as head coach, despite a 2012–13 season where the team did not promote to La Liga.

Players like Mate Bilić or Juan Pablo who spent several years in Gijón, ended their contract and left the team. Also, David Rodríguez, Cristian Bustos and Bernardo finished their loan and came back to Celta de Vigo and Sevilla. The Colombian defender finally agreed to continue playing for Sporting during the next three seasons.

The first new additions came from Córdoba: Aritz López Garai and Alberto. Both players were free transfers.

On 21 June, president Manuel Vega-Arango resigned after spending 21 years in two stages as chairman of Sporting de Gijón. Antonio Veiga was named acting president while Vega-Arango was proposed as Honorary President of the club.

Hugo Fraile was the first sign in the month, fourth of the summer. He came from Getafe in a free transfer. Days later, Sporting de Gijón confirmed an agreement with Celta de Vigo for loaning Cristian Bustos during one more season. Bustos will be transferred to Sporting until 2016 if the club promotes to La Liga.

On 10 July, the team started the preseason in Mareo. In that same day, Javier Casquero extended his contract one more year. One week later, and after days of rumours, Serbian striker Stefan Šćepović arrived with a three-year loan from Partizan Belgrade. Sporting has an option for buying him at the end of the season or for extending the loan one more season.

Few days before the first friendly game, Isma López arrived from Athletic Bilbao while three footballers left Sporting: Óscar Trejo was transferred by €2.1m to French squad Toulouse FC and Gastón Sangoy and Ricardo León agreed with the club the rescission of their contracts. Argentinian player joined Apollon Limassol from Cyprus and León came back to Tenerife.

Grégory Arnolin played the 2013 CONCACAF Gold Cup with Martinique. The team was eliminated in the Group Stage.

Preseason started on 20 July with a loss in Segovia against English squad Brighton & Hove Albion by 1–2. Four days later, Sporting played its first game in Asturias against Marino de Luanco and solved it with an easy win by 3–0. Stefan Šćepović with two goals.

On 2 August, Asturian young prospect Borja López was transferred to AS Monaco by €2.2 million, and days later, Juan Muñiz was loaned to Mirandés.

Preseason ended with a loss by 1–4 against Villarreal in the classic Trofeo Villa de Gijón. Carlos Carmona scored the goal for Sporting.

August
Sporting started the league on 18 August playing at El Molinón against Real Madrid Castilla. The team of Sandoval won by 1–0 thanks to a beautiful goal of Stefan Šćepović.  It was the first time since 2008 Sporting started the league with a win.

The team continued unbeaten in league with a draw at Recreativo de Huelva. Three days later, another Serbian striker was signed on loan: Dejan Lekić from Gençlerbirliği.

September
After a win by 2–0 against Deportivo de La Coruña, which was its fifth game unbeaten in the league, Sporting achivied the direct promotion positions. Stefan Šćepović became the first newcomer in the history of the club which scored in his first five league games.

Previously to this match, Sporting was eliminated of the Copa del Rey after an overtime against Recreativo de Huelva.

The first loss in league arrived in the sixth week at Mendizorroza, where Deportivo Alavés swept Sporting by a devastating 3–0 in the worst game at the moment of the team of Gijón. It was the first game of Šćepović without scoring.

In the next week, Sporting maintained unbeaten at El Molinón after beating Eibar by 3–2 thanks to a hat-trick of Šćepović, who celebrated his call-up with the Serbian national team.

October
October was not a good month for Sporting, with two ties at Numancia and versus Jaén in Gijón and a defeat by 2–1 at Girona despite starting leading the game with a goal of Hugo Fraile.

On 22 October, Stefan Šćepović was nominated by the LFP as September's best player in Segunda División.

November

Dejan Lekić started to play regularly with Sporting and the team rose up in the league table. The second Serbian striker scored in the four games and contributed decisively to finish the month without being defeated, despite having played only one of the four games in the month at El Molinón. With two wins against Lugo and Sabadell and two ties, with serious refereeing errors, at the stadiums of Córdoba and Murcia (where the referee of the game did not call a penalty after a ball stopped with the hand by Joan Guillem Truyols), Sporting finished the month of November in promotion playoffs positions, with only a difference of three points with the direct promotion positions.

December
As in November, Sporting finished for second month in a row with two wins and two ties, which allowed to finish 2013 in the second position of the league table. A tie at El Molinón against Alcorcón by 2–2 was followed by two wins versus Hércules with a brilliant goal of Santi Jara and Mirandés by 3–2, with the three goals scored by the two Serbian strikers in only six minutes. After this game, Mirandés' coach Gonzalo Arconada was sacked.

The year finished with a 2–2 tie at Mini Estadi, against Barcelona B in a game where Stefan Šćepović goaled at 87', but a fantastic free kick executed by Edu Bedia avoided the loss of the reserve team of Barcelona.

January
On January 4, Sporting was defeated at home by Zaragoza in a controversial game refereed by Andalusian Santos Pargaña, who sent off Luis Hernández, Iván Hernández and Nacho Cases. With eight players and with 2–2 in the scoreboard, Iván Cuéllar saved a penalty kick, but with only two minutes left, Sergio Cidoncha decided the game. In the half time of this match, manager José Ramón Sandoval was assaulted by the assistant coach of Zaragoza. After this game, the club board talked about a "shameful persecution", referring to the controversial refereeing games during the season.

The club finished the first half of the season with a draw without goals at Santa Cruz de Tenerife. This point allowed Sporting to be in the second position after 21 rounds with an advantage of one point with the third qualified team (Eibar) and two with the seventh (Las Palmas).

On 16 January, Aritz López Garai rejected several offers from Spanish, Greek and Cypriot teams, despite not being called by Sandoval since December, and decided to finish the season with the aim of achieving the promotion to La Liga.

Sporting became leader of the league after winning at Alfredo di Stéfano Stadium by 2–1 to Real Madrid Castilla, with the sixteenth goal of Stefan Šćepović, with only 12 minutes left. The team could not retain the leadership the next round; Sporting conceded a no-goals draw with Recreativo de Huelva.
On 29 January, vice-captain Alberto Lora renewed its contract until 2018. On the next day, Nacho Cases renewed too for four years.

February
Sporting started the month of February beating Mallorca at Iberostar Estadi by 3–1 in a great game. It continued undefeated by fifth week in a row despite only earning a draw by 1–1 versus Ponferradina. Stefan Šćepović scored his 17th goal and three days later, on February 12, Sporting paid the €1M buyout to Partizan.

On February 16, Sporting earned a draw at Riazor by 1–1. 7,000 fans travelled from Gijón to A Coruña for watching the team against Deportivo. The game started with a goal of Bernardo for the red and whites. Later, in another controversial game, Deportivo missed a penalty kick, a legal goal was not conceded to Stefan Šćepović and Deportivo scored more than one minute after the end of the additional time.

Sporting finished the month earning a win by 2–0 against Deportivo Alavés, with goals made by Carmona and Santi Jara. After this win, the team of Sandoval accumulated seven weeks with no losses and was located in fourth position with 45 points, only one point behind the three leaders (Recreativo de Huelva, Deportivo de La Coruña and Eibar, team which Sporting visited in the first game of March).

March
In a very important game, Eibar defended the leadership sweeping Sporting by 3–0 at Ipurua. Despite this loss and two more weeks without winning (2–2 at home against Numancia and 3–2 versus Jaén), Sporting continued in the fourth position and rose to the third one with a win by 3–1 versus Girona. Dejan Lekić scored twice after several weeks since his last goal.

On March 24, Aritz López Garai, who after being in the Starting XI in the first fourteen games did not play any minute more, was loaned to Córdoba. Six days later, Sporting was defeated by Las Palmas 2–1 in a game where the Serbians missed several opportunities to score. Finally, a doubtful penalty kick gave the three points to the Canarian team.

April
The bad streak continued in the first half of April, taking out Sporting from the promotion playoffs position. Two more losses against Córdoba and Sabadell, started to worry the club board and planned to sack José Ramón Sandoval as Sporting coach. Finally, president Antonio Veiga decided to keep the Madrilenian one more week, waiting to the result and the people reaction after the next game, against Murcia.

On 15 April 2014, Hugo Fraile broke the Anterior cruciate ligament of his left knee. With this important injury, the forward could not finish the season.

In the last game of the month, Sporting defeated Lugo by 2–0, for closing a streak of four games without winning and recovering the spot in the promotion playoffs, lost two weeks before. Stefan Šćepović scored his 22nd goal, six weeks before its last one at Real Jaén.

May
On May 4, after the loss at Alcorcón by 1–0, the club board decided to sack José Ramón Sandoval. Abelardo, manager of the reserve team which won by 1–4 over Real Oviedo the week before, was named his substitute until the end of the season. On May 7, Jony, player of the reserve team, agreed a professional two-year contract with the club.

In the debut game of both, on May 10 versus Hércules, Sporting won by 2–1. Jony scored his first goal and Dejan Lekić finished the comeback.

Sporting started an undefeated streak by earning one point at Mirandés and dropping Barcelona B, third qualified, with the second goal of Jony.

The team finished the month at La Romareda, drawing by 1–1 to Real Zaragoza thanks to a goal of Bernardo in the 88th minute. This point allowed Sporting to finish the month in fifth position with one game to play.

June
Sporting qualified to the promotion playoffs in the last day, with a win against Tenerife by 3–0. In the promotion playoffs, Sporting was dropped in the semifinals by Las Palmas by an aggregate score of 2–0.

Players

Current squad

Youth system

In

Total expenditure: €0 million

Out

Total income: €5.5 million

Net income:  €5.5 million

Technical staff

Managerial changes

Competitions

Pre-season and friendlies

Segunda División

League table

Results summary

Positions by round

Matches

Play-offs

Matches

Copa del Rey

Matches

Statistics

Appearances and goals

|}

Disciplinary record

Man of the match
The Man of the match is selected by Sporting de Gijón fans in the official website every week Iafter the game. 100 points will be given to the most voted player, 50 to the second one and 25 to the third one.

After the end of the main league, Stefan Šćepović was named winner of the trophy.

Voting per game

Accumulated points

See also
2013–14 Segunda División
2013–14 Copa del Rey

References

Sporting de Gijón seasons
Sporting de Gijon